The 2013 Oberstaufen Cup was a professional tennis tournament played on clay courts. It was the 22nd edition of the tournament which was part of the 2013 ATP Challenger Tour. It took place in Oberstaufen, Germany between 22 and 28 July 2013.

Singles main draw entrants

Seeds

 1 Rankings are as of July 15, 2013.

Other entrants
The following players received wildcards into the singles main draw:
  Andreas Beck
  Robin Kern
  Kevin Krawietz
  Maximilian Marterer

The following players received entry from the qualifying draw:
  Stephan Fransen
  Ivo Minář
  Thiago Monteiro
  Alexey Vatutin

Champions

Singles

 Guillaume Rufin def.  Peter Gojowczyk 6–3, 6–4

Doubles

 Dominik Meffert /  Philipp Oswald def.  Stephan Fransen /  Artem Sitak 6–1, 3–6, [14–12]

External links
Official website

Oberstaufen Cup
Oberstaufen Cup
2013 in German tennis